The Eight Views (in ;) is an East Asian term used to allude to the most beautiful or otherwise significant scenes of a certain area. It is a term often used in East Asia. Historically, various series of eight views were produced; in some cases, such as in the Eight Views of Xiaoxiang multiple series, a whole artistic tradition was developed, with a number of artists doing versions of the series. Series of eight views typically appeared in poetry and paintings in the olden times; and now, they may appear in local governments' advertisements to tourists.

The Eight Views 
The general "eight views", which have no particular order, are:
Night Rain
Mandarin: 
Cantonese: 
Japanese: 
Descending Geese
Mandarin: 
Cantonese: 
Japanese: 
Clearing Weather
Mandarin: 
Cantonese: 
Japanese: 
Evening Bells
Mandarin: 
Cantonese: 
Japanese: 
Sunset Glow
Mandarin: 
Cantonese: 
Japanese: 
Evening Snow
Mandarin: 
Cantonese: 
Japanese: 
Autumn Moon
Mandarin: 
Cantonese: 
Japanese: 
Returning Sails
Mandarin: 
Cantonese: 
Japanese:

Mainland China

Original eight views 
 Eight Views of Xiaoxiang, Hunan Province (The original "Eight Views" that influenced the other Eight Views.)

Later eight views 
 Eight Views of Mount Huang (黃山八勝), Shandong Province
 Eight Views of Chang'an (長安八景), also called Eight Views of Guanzhong (關中八景), Xi'an, Shaanxi Province
 Eight Views of Luoyang (in ), Luoyang, Henan Province
 Eight Views of Jinling (金陵八景), Nanjing, Jiangsu Province
 Eight Views of Ram City (羊城八景), Guangzhou, Guangdong Province
 Eight Views of Yanjing (鷰京八景), Beijing
 Eight Views of Jinzhou (Dalian) (金州古八景), Liaoning Province
 Eight Views of Luda (旅大八景), Liaoning Province
 Twelve Views of Bayu (巴渝十二景), Chongqing
 Eighteen Views of Lushan (廬山十八景), Lushan, Jiangsu Province

Japan
 Eight Views of Omi (近江八景), Shiga Prefecture
 Eight Views of Lake Biwa (琵琶湖八景 in Japanese), Shiga Prefecture - 1949
 Eight Views of Kanazawa (金沢八景 in Japanese), Kanagawa Prefecture
 Eight Views of Samani (様似八景), Hokkaido
 New Eight Views of Japan (日本新八景 in Japanese) - 1927

 Thirty-six Views of Mount Fuji, by Hokusai and by Hiroshige

Korea
 Eight Views of Korea
 Eight Views of Danyang 
 Eight Views of Pyongyang

Taiwan
 Eight Views of Taiwan (in )

Chinese iconography
Chinese painting
Geography of China
Geography of Japan
Geography of Korea
Geography of Taiwan
Japanese painting
Korean painting